Patrik Auda (born August 29, 1989) is a Czech basketball player, who plays for Yokohama B-Corsairs of the B.League. He also represents the Czech national team.

References

External links
 Patrik Auda at eurobasket.com
 

1989 births
Living people
2019 FIBA Basketball World Cup players
AZS Koszalin players
Basketball players at the 2020 Summer Olympics
Bàsquet Manresa players
Boulazac Basket Dordogne players
Czech expatriate basketball people in France
Czech expatriate basketball people in Italy
Czech expatriate basketball people in Spain
Czech expatriate basketball people in the United States
Czech expatriate basketball people in Poland
Czech men's basketball players
KKS Pro-Basket Kutno players
Lega Basket Serie A players
Liga ACB players
Olympic basketball players of the Czech Republic
People from Ivančice
Pistoia Basket 2000 players
Power forwards (basketball)
Rosa Radom players
Seton Hall Pirates men's basketball players
Sportspeople from the South Moravian Region